The 34th Vehbi Emre & Hamit Kaplan Tournament 2016, was a wrestling event held in Istanbul, Turkey between 30 and 31 January 2016.

This international tournament includes competition men's Greco-Roman wrestling. This ranking tournament was held in honor of the Olympic Champion, Hamit Kaplan and  Turkish Wrestler and manager Vehbi Emre.

Medal overview

Medal table

Greco-Roman

Participating nations

References 

Vehbi Emre and Hamit Kaplan
Vehbi Emre and Hamit Kaplan
June 2016 sports events in Turkey
Sports competitions in Istanbul
International wrestling competitions hosted by Turkey
Vehbi Emre & Hamit Kaplan Tournament